Eatoniella globosa is a species of marine gastropod mollusc in the family Eatoniellidae. It was first described by Winston F. Ponder in 1965. It is endemic to the waters of New Zealand.

Description

Eatoniella globosa has a thin, fragile pinkish shell. The holotype measured 1.15 mm by 0.8 mm, and has a similar appearance to Eatoniella notalabia.

Distribution

The species is endemic to New Zealand. The holotype was collected by K. Hipkins in 1949 from Piwhane / Spirits Bay, on the Aupouri Peninsula in Northland. Since 1965, the species has been known to appear to the north and north-east of the North Island. In 2005, a specimen of Eatoniella globosa was found off the coast of Raglan, extending its known range to the west coast of the North Island. Rare specimens have been found in the Tamaki River of Auckland.

Eatoniella globosa has been shown to live almost exclusively on a species of red Corallina seaweed.

References

Eatoniellidae
Gastropods described in 1965
Gastropods of New Zealand
Endemic fauna of New Zealand
Endemic molluscs of New Zealand
Molluscs of the Pacific Ocean
Taxa named by Winston Ponder